Gennady Vladimirović Morozov (Russian: Геннадий Владимирович Морозов; born 30 December 1962) is a Russian football coach and a former player.

Honours
 Soviet Top League winner: 1989.

International career
Morozov made his debut for USSR on 7 August 1985 in a friendly against Romania. He played at the 1986 FIFA World Cup in a game against Canada.

External links
 Profile

1962 births
Footballers from Moscow
Living people
Russian footballers
Soviet footballers
Soviet Union international footballers
1986 FIFA World Cup players
FC Spartak Moscow players
FC Dynamo Moscow players
Soviet Top League players
Russian football managers
Russian expatriate sportspeople in Ukraine
Russian expatriate football managers
Association football defenders
FC Krymteplytsia Molodizhne managers